A Christmas Prince: The Royal Baby is a 2019 American Christmas romantic comedy film directed by John Schultz from a screenplay by Nate Atkin, based on characters created by Karen Schaler. The film stars Rose McIver, Ben Lamb and Sarah Douglas. It is the third and final installment of the Christmas Prince series, following the 2018 film A Christmas Prince: The Royal Wedding and the 2017 film A Christmas Prince.

The film once again follows Queen Amber and King Richard of Aldovia as they prepare to welcome their first child. However, when a priceless royal artifact is stolen from inside the palace, the couple must race against the clock to solve the mystery in order to save their family and kingdom.

The film was released on December 5, 2019, by Netflix.

Plot

One year after the events of the last film, King Richard and Queen Amber of Aldovia are preparing to welcome their first child. During a press conference, the royal couple tell the public they do not know the gender of their baby and keep all possible names secret, even from their family. Richard’s previously villainous cousin, Simon, who is still trying to regain his family’s trust, reveals he invited Melissa, Amber’s close friend, to Aldovia for Christmas. Melissa tells Amber she and Simon are in love, much to Amber's surprise.

Amber and Richard prepare for the signing of a treaty which honours the peace found between Aldovia and their greatest ally, Penglia. On Christmas Eve 1419, both Prince Claude of Aldovia and the Penglian Prince Jun signed the treaty, ending an ongoing feud between them. It has been renewed every 100 years since. Amber is excited to be the first Aldovian queen to sign it, but she is told the Penglians will not permit this.

On 20 December, King Tai and Queen Ming of Penglia arrive in Aldovia. Amber tries to convince Ming the two of them should join their husbands in signing the treaty, but Ming refuses. Before the royals can sign the treaty, they discover it has been stolen. Since a blizzard has closed all airports, Amber and Richard deduce the treaty must still be in the palace, along with the thief. The palace staff  launch an investigation. Meanwhile, Richard’s sister, Princess Emily, learns about an ancient legend that states a deadly curse will befall the firstborn child of the monarchs responsible for breaking the treaty. She realises that would be Amber and Richard’s baby.

As Amber worries about the deadline for completing the tradition approaching, her dad, Rudy, convinces her to throw her baby shower despite the blizzard stopping the majority of the guests from getting there. With the help of Sahil and her old friend Andy, Amber enjoys a beautiful baby shower. Ming gifts her a handmade present, and Tai helps Richard build the baby's crib. He tells Richard he is more than willing to let Amber and Ming sign the treaty, but says that Ming is worried that by doing so, her country will think she seeks credit. At the shower, Ming and Tai's attaché, Lynn, bonds with Simon over their Oxford days together, which makes Melissa jealous.

As Christmas and the deadline for the signing of the treaty approach, Richard brings in a sniffer dog to locate the treaty. While the dog searches, the family visit Aldovia's Christmas market. The Penglians are impressed by how loved and respected Amber and Richard are by their people. Mr. Zabala reports that the dog’s search came out futile. Overwhelmed, Amber faints.

Back at the palace, Amber assures Richard she is fine, but he advises her to rest. Emily arrives and tells the couple about the legend. While Richard rebuffs it as superstitious nonsense, Amber is terrified and refuses to give up looking for the treaty. Melissa spies on Simon and Lynn and retrieves a discarded piece of paper Simon threw away. She shows Amber and Richard, and they are shocked to discover it is a detailed account of Aldovia's debt to Penglia over the years. While Aldovia's latest economic scheme has reduced it drastically, the kingdom still owes its allies $1 billion and, if the treaty is not found, Aldovia would owe it immediately. Amber pleads with Melissa to make sure Simon doesn’t suspect anything and, despite being heartbroken and feeling betrayed, she agrees.

Just then, Amber goes into labor. Richard summons Dr. Magoro to the palace, but the doctor's car becomes stuck in a snow bank. Richard sets out on horseback to rescue her. Queen Ming, who worked at a maternity hospital, and Melissa guide Amber through her contractions. Amber realises something, and instructs Emily to search the castle dungeons with her mother, Queen Helena. While searching, the pair are trapped in a cell. Richard finds Dr Magoro, and they hurry back to the palace. Trying to escape, Emily and her mother find the missing treaty hidden under a stone. Using her hair clip, Helena frees them both.

With the treaty found, the kings prepare to sign. Ming decides she wants to add her name to the treaty as well, much to the delight of Amber. At 11:59 pm on 24 December 2019, King Richard, King Tai, Queen Ming and Queen Amber sign the treaty. Amber reveals the culprit behind the treaty’s disappearance: Mr Little. She discovered that Mr Little’s mother’s maiden name was Devin, the same surname as Prince Claude, who was allegedly poisoned by Prince Jun following the original signing of the treaty. Claude’s family swore vengeance. Little confesses, but swears he never intended to harm the royal baby. Helena has Little sent to the dungeons. Despite this, Melissa demands to know why Simon had the accounts for Aldovia's debt. Simon reveals he and Lynn were trying to add economic amendments to the treaty which would benefit both kingdoms. He then pulls out a ring box and proposes to Melissa, who happily accepts.

Amber’s contractions intensify, and Doctor Magoro orders everyone except Richard out of the room. With Richard’s help, Amber gives birth to a healthy baby girl, whom the couple name Princess Elleri after Amber’s late mother. Elleri's birth is officially announced to the public. The film closes with Amber writing her last blog post, thanking her readers for supporting her through the years and, on behalf of Richard, Elleri and the whole of Aldovia, she wishes everyone a Merry Christmas and Happy New Year.

Cast

Production

Filming
Filming took place between March 2019 and June 2019 with the filming once again taking place in Romania.

Release
It was released on December 5, 2019 by Netflix.

Reception

See also
 List of Christmas films

References

External links
 

2019 romantic comedy films
2010s Christmas films
American Christmas films
American romantic comedy films
American sequel films
American Christmas comedy films
2010s English-language films
Films about royalty
Films about weddings
Films directed by John Schultz (director)
Films set in a fictional country
Films shot in Romania
English-language Netflix original films
2019 films
2010s American films